The Netherlands Antilles competed at the 1972 Summer Olympics in Munich, West Germany. Two competitors, both men, took part in two events in two sports.

Shooting

One shooter represented the Netherlands Antilles in 1972.

50 m rifle, prone
 Bèto Adriana

Weightlifting

References

External links
Official Olympic Reports

Nations at the 1972 Summer Olympics
1972 Summer Olympics
1972 in the Netherlands Antilles